Hendeh Garan (also Romanized as Hendeh Garān; also known as Hendeh Karān) is a village in Tula Rud Rural District, in the Central District of Talesh County, Gilan Province, Iran. At the 2006 census, its population was 454, in 92 families.

References 

Populated places in Talesh County